Shinee The Best From Now On is the first Japanese compilation by South Korean boy group, Shinee. The album was released on April 18, 2018, preceded by a new single, "From Now On". The album officially marks the first Shinee release to feature Jonghyun after his death on December 18, 2017. The album sold over 95,000 copies in Japan, and was certified Gold there. It peaked at number one on the Oricon charts.

Background and release
Shinee's lead vocalist Jonghyun died on December 18, 2017. In February 2018, it was announced that Shinee would release their first Japanese compilation album, Shinee The Best From Now On. Shinee performed new songs from the album at their concert Shinee World The Best 2018, including lead single "From Now On". The songs had been recorded prior to Jonghyun's death and featured his vocals. Following the concert, "From Now On" entered the Billboard Japan Hot 100 despite not having been officially released due to high levels of Twitter activity surrounding the performance. Fans began using the song title as a hashtag to share their love for the group. Shinee promoted the single through lyric videos uploaded to their Instagram Stories ahead of its release on March 26.

Shinee The Best From Now On was released on April 18, 2018, featuring 20 songs. Two limited edition versions were also released, containing a bonus disc with eight additional songs, a 64-page photobook and a documentary of the concert Shinee World 2017. To commemorate the album's release, five towers in different Japanese cities, representing the five Shinee members, were lit up in Shinee's signature aqua colour. This included Tokyo Tower, which also hosted a costume exhibition. Messages from fans to Shinee were published in The Asahi Shimbun following a social media campaign. On May 23, the new songs included on the limited edition bonus disc were released digitally for the first time as part of an EP titled From Now On.

Track listing

Charts

Weekly charts

Monthly charts

Year-end charts

Release history

References

External links
  
  
  

Shinee albums
2018 compilation albums
Japanese-language compilation albums
EMI Records compilation albums